Child of Glass is a 1978 American made-for-television family fantasy film produced by Walt Disney Productions and based upon the novel The Ghost Belonged to Me by Richard Peck. Its plot follows a young boy who moves into a former plantation in Louisiana, and encounters the ghost of a young girl who was murdered on the property.

It originally aired on NBC as a presentation of The Wonderful World of Disney on May 14, 1978. The film was also re-aired sporadically during the early to mid-1980s, often on weekends during the afternoon. The filming locations were in Danville, Kentucky and New Orleans, Louisiana.

Plot
Alexander Armsworth and his family move into an antebellum Louisiana plantation. Alexander's mother and sister become set on restoring the home to its former glory, but Alexander is unsettled by the mysterious lights he sees around the property. He also meets his new neighbor, Blossom Culp, a superstitious girl raised by her spiritualist aunt. In spite of Blossom's strange and sometimes annoying ways, she becomes a loyal friend.

One night Alexander sees the mysterious lights once more and follows them into the old barn, where he finds the ghost of a young Creole girl, Inez Dumaine, and her dog. Inez's uncle was the notorious pirate Jacques Dumaine, former owner of the plantation. In life, Inez refused to reveal the location of her family's fortune to Jacques, who murdered her and her dog by throwing them down the well in the barn. As revenge, he cursed her ghost to remain on the property. In order to be free of the curse, Inez must solve a riddle and begs Alexander to help her, while warning him that if the riddle is not solved before All Saints' Eve (Halloween), she will be trapped forever and forced to reenact her murder every night. The riddle states:

Sleeping lies the murdered lass.Vainly cries the child of glass.When the two shall be as one,the spirit's journey will be done.

When he realizes that Inez herself must be "the murdered lass," Alexander enlists Blossom and her grandmother to find the "child of glass." In a vision using Blossom's crystal ball, Alexander sees Inez alive with her mother, who makes Inez promise to look after her china doll Babette. Waking from the vision, Alexander realizes that the doll Babette must be the "child of glass."

Meanwhile, Alexander's mother fires a disgruntled handyman, Amory Timmons, who burns down the barn as revenge. Alexander witnesses the fire and Amory attempts to murder him. Alexander escapes by running into the burning barn, but falls into the old well. Roused by the barn fire, Alexander's family realize that he is missing, while Amory has escaped. As the police search for Alexander and Amory, Inez's dog leads Blossom to the well house, where she sees the unconscious Alexander on a ledge. Blossom is the only one light enough to be lowered down the well to tie a rope to Alexander. While doing so, she discovers Babette on the same ledge. Both Alexander and the doll are taken safely from the well.

Alexander and Blossom located Inez's family tomb and lay the doll on her grave, freeing her from the curse. However, Amory tracks Alexander and Blossom to the tomb and is on the verge of killing them both when Inez manifests as a terrifying, wailing ghost that scares him into fleeing. Inez thanks Alexander and Blossom for their help before going to her final rest. Before Inez departs forever, the doll rises from the grave and smashes on the floor, revealing that its head is full of diamonds—the long-lost Dumaine treasure that Inez was sworn to protect. Inez has given Alexander the treasure to help his family restore her home.

Cast
Barbara Barrie as Emily Armsworth 
Biff McGuire as Joe Armsworth 
Anthony Zerbe as Amory Timmons
Nina Foch as Aunt Lavinia Culp 
Katy Kurtzman as Blossom Culp 
Steve Shaw as Alexander Armsworth 
Olivia Barash as Inez Dumaine 
Denise Nickerson as Connie Sue Armsworth 
Jack Rader as Sheriff Muncey 
Irene Tedrow as Miss Merryweather 
Lilyan Chauvin as Madame Dumaine 
David Hurst as Jacques Dumaine 
Sue Ann Gilfillan as Ludee Calhoun

Filming
The film was shot on location in Danville, Kentucky in August 1977. For the scene in which the exterior barn burns, the production used pyrotechnics to burn a real barn that was purchased from a local man, dismantled, and relocated to a different site where it was reassembled.

The graveyard scenes were filmed in Bellevue Cemetery in Danville, but there was no appropriate tomb for the final scene, therefore one was built in the cemetery. The set remained a popular tourist attraction for years afterwards.

Home media
Disney released the film on VHS in early 1987 and a DVD-on-Demand version of this film as part of their Disney Generations Collection line of DVDs on December 5, 2011.

References

External links
Child of Glass DVD

1978 television films
1978 films
1970s ghost films
1970s fantasy films
American fantasy films
American ghost films
American haunted house films
Films directed by John Erman
Films produced by Ron W. Miller
Films shot in New Orleans
Films based on American novels
Disney television films
Walt Disney anthology television series episodes
American films about Halloween
1970s American films
Films shot in Kentucky
Danville, Kentucky
Films set in Louisiana